Halibut Cove is a census-designated place (CDP) in Kenai Peninsula Borough, Alaska, United States. The population was 76 at the 2010 census, up from 35 in 2000.

Originally a fishing village, Halibut Cove is now home to several artists and businesses. One of the only floating U.S. post offices is there. A popular tourist destination, the cove offers several lodges and cabins and the only way to get around the cove is by boat.

Geography
Halibut Cove is located in the southern part of the Kenai Peninsula at  (59.597549, -151.234607). The CDP is bordered to the east by Halibut Cove and to the west by China Poot Bay, both of which are arms of Kachemak Bay. Peterson Bay is an inlet west of Ismailof Island.

Visitors reach Halibut Cove by private boat from Homer; by the locally operated ferry, the Danny J.', 'Stormbird; or by float plane. There is no road access; the primary modes of transportation within the cove are by foot, skiff, or ATV. Areas open to the public around the lagoon are connected by boardwalks, and many homes and businesses are fully or partially constructed on pilings over the water.

Climate
Nabesna has a continental subarctic climate (Köppen Dsc).

Demographics

Halibut Cove first appeared on the 1940 U.S. Census as an unincorporated village. It did not appear on the 1950 census, but returned again in 1960, and in every successive census to date. It was made a census-designated place (CDP) in 1980.

As of the census of 2010, there were 76 people, 34 households, and 21 families residing in the CDP. There were 161 housing units, of which 127, or 78.9%, were vacant. 99 of the vacant housing units were for seasonal or vacation use. The racial makeup of the CDP was 86.8% white, 6.6% Alaska Native American, and 6.6% from two or more races.

Of the 34 households, 17.6% had children under the age of 18 living with them, 55.9% were headed by married couples living together, and 38.2% were non-families. 32.4% of all households were individuals, and 14.7% were someone living alone age 65 years or older. The average household size was 2.24, and the average family size was 2.57.

In the CDP, 10.5% of the population were under the age of 18, 13.1% were from 18 to 24, 23.6% were from 25 to 44, 38.1% were from 45 to 64, and 14.5% were 65 years of age or older. The median age was 47.5 years. For every 100 females, there were 117.1 males. For every 100 females age 18 and over, there were 119.4 males.

External links

Halibut Cove website

References

Census-designated places in Alaska
Census-designated places in Kenai Peninsula Borough, Alaska
Populated coastal places in Alaska on the Pacific Ocean
Road-inaccessible communities of Alaska